Sinanas is a genus of prehistoric duck that lived during the middle Miocene. The single known species is Sinanas diatomas. Fossils of the species have been recovered from the Shandong Province of China. Taxonomists are uncertain as to its affinities to modern waterfowl.

References

External links
Sinanas  at fossilworks

Miocene birds
Prehistoric birds of Asia
Anseriformes
Fossil taxa described in 1980